New Irish Hymns 2: Father, Son, and Holy Spirit is the second in a series of themed albums created and produced by Keith Getty. This album features vocalists Margaret Becker, Joanne Hogg, and Kristyn Lennox (Getty) performing songs by Keith Getty and others (as indicated below). Margaret Becker and Joanne Hogg performed on the previous album, New Irish Hymns; all three singers also performed on New Irish Hymns 3: Incarnation and New Irish Hymns 4: Hymns for the Life of the Church.

Track listing
"See, What a Morning (Resurrection Hymn)" (by Keith Getty and Stuart Townend)
"I Will Trust" (by Kristyn Lennox (Getty) and Keith Getty)
"God of Grace" (by Jonathan Rea and Keith Getty)
"Join All the Glorious Names" (by Kristyn Lennox (Getty) and Keith Getty)
"My Heart is Filled" (by Keith Getty and Stuart Townend)
"Cross of Jesus" (by Kristyn Lennox (Getty) and Keith Getty)
"Come, Let Us Sing" (by Kristyn Lennox (Getty) and Keith Getty)
"Jesus, Ever Abiding Friend" (by Keith Getty and Steve Siler)
"Jesus is Lord" (by Keith Getty and Stuart Townend)
"Repentance" (by Keith Getty and Stuart Townend)
"Oh My Soul" (by Keith Getty and Margaret Becker)
"The Risen Christ (Doxology)" (by Keith Getty and Phil Madeira)

Credits 

Keith Getty – Composer, producer, orchestrator, piano
Stephen Doherty – Executive producer
Margaret Becker – Co-producer
Tim Oliver – Keyboards, programming, prelude on “My Heart is Filled”
Ken Lewis – Drums and percussion
Stephen Leiweke – Guitars
Peter Wilson – Background vocals
Chris Donohue – Bass guitar, low whistles, accordion
City of Prague Philharmonic Orchestra – Strings

See also
New Irish Hymns (series)

2003 albums
Kristyn Getty albums
Margaret Becker albums
Joanne Hogg albums
Christian music albums by artists from Northern Ireland